The Coin Collector's Survival Manual  is a coin collecting and investing reference book
authored by Scott A. Travers that was first published by Arco, a Prentice-Hall imprint, in
July 1984 simultaneously in hardcover and paper editions. Its then 22-year-old author
bluntly detailed the coin industry's perils and pitfalls in buying, selling and storing
valuable coins based on his experiences as a dealer. The book has since been updated
and published in multiple editions.

In 1988, when its second edition was published by Prentice Hall Trade, a division of
Simon & Schuster, it was considered an important part of the coin literature. 
The third (1994); revised third (1996); fourth (2000); and revised fourth (2003) editions
were published by Bonus Books of Chicago.

Beginning with the fifth edition, The Coin Collector's Survival Manual incorporated
another book authored by Scott A. Travers, How to Make Money in Coins Right Now, and
the combination work was published in 2006 by House of Collectibles, an imprint of
Random House. House of Collectibles published the sixth (2008); seventh (2010); and
revised seventh (2015) editions. 

The Numismatic Literary Guild (NLG) gave The Coin Collector's Survival Manual
twelve awards, including "Book of the Year" in 1984 and in 2006 for the fifth edition,
where it was tied.  The revised seventh edition was named "Best Investment Book" in
2016.

The book has been cited in various news articles as authoritative about evaluating coins.

References

Publications established in 1984
Coins
Numismatics
Numismatic catalogs